Hans Schlecht (born 23 January 1948) is an Austrian retired slalom canoeist who competed in the early-to-mid 1970s. He won a gold medal in the K-1 team event at the 1971 ICF Canoe Slalom World Championships in Meran.

Schlecht also finished 15th in the K-1 event at the 1972 Summer Olympics in Munich.

References

1948 births
Austrian male canoeists
Canoeists at the 1972 Summer Olympics
Living people
Olympic canoeists of Austria
Medalists at the ICF Canoe Slalom World Championships